Doo Wop is a 2004 French romantic drama film directed, produced and written by David Lanzmann. It won the Mannheim-Heidelberg International Filmfestival for Award of Independent Cinema Owners, FIPRESCI Prize, and Special Prize of the Jury. The plot of the film is centered on the figure of a band manage who manages former girlfriend's band but struggles for his debt of the loan sharks.

Cast
 as  Ziggy 
Caroline Ducey as  Marie 
Elina Löwensohn as  Maya 
Clovis Cornillac as  Thierry 
Philippe Nahon as  Michel 
Grégory Fitoussi as  The seller

External links

2004 films
2004 romantic drama films
2004 drama films
French romantic drama films
2000s French films
2000s French-language films